Space compression may refer to:

 data compression
 space folding (disambiguation)
 time-space compression